Alain Gest (born 27 December 1950 in Amiens, Somme) is a French politician. He was elected on 16 June 2002 to the 12th French National Assembly, representing the sixth district of Somme. He was reelected on 17 June 2007 to the 13th French National Assembly. He is a member of the Union for a Popular Movement party.

References 

Union for a Popular Movement politicians
1950 births
Living people
Deputies of the 12th National Assembly of the French Fifth Republic
Deputies of the 13th National Assembly of the French Fifth Republic
Deputies of the 14th National Assembly of the French Fifth Republic